Monday Magazine is a free arts and entertainment magazine in Victoria, British Columbia, Canada. Contrary to what the name suggests, Monday was distributed throughout the greater Victoria area every Thursday until July 2013 when it became an arts calendar monthly. The publication features articles on art, food and entertainment in Victoria but is most widely used as an event listing.

Monday was founded in 1975 by Gene Miller, a native New Yorker who arrived in Victoria in 1970, five years before founding Monday. Miller aspired to create a publication for the Victoria readership that was rooted in the social consciousness of the  Village Voice but written in the style of The New Yorker.

Shortly after establishing the paper, Miller was joined by Andrew Lynch and George Heffelfinger and the three divided ownership equally. In 1988, Miller—disheartened with his creation—sold his one-third interest to Lynch and Heffelfinger. Andrew Lynch continued in his role as publisher of Monday until it was taken over by David Black's Island Publishers Ltd. in 1996. It is currently published by Black Press.

Until May 1, 2013, Monday Magazine earned its reputation as a critical voice in Victoria's political, social and cultural communities. It is no longer a member of the Association of Alternative Newsweeklies. The paper targets educated, active adults and currently reaches approximately 38,445 households.

Monday routinely received awards for investigative features on the environment, social and political justice, arts, culture and the outdoors. In 2011 and 2012, its staff earned 20 newspaper awards through the BCYCNA, CCNA and AAN organizations. Monday Magazine historically tended to the left of the political spectrum and was often critical of centre and right wing politicians and policies at the city and provincial levels.

After May 1, 2013, Black Press decided to eliminate the political, environmental and edgy material, cancelling Dan Savage's sex column and other controversial material, choosing instead to target upper-middle-class readers. It now features restaurant reviews, interior design articles and middle-of-the-road concert reviews.

On August 1, 2020, the Victoria City Council announced that they will look at eliminating downtown newspaper boxes, including those for Monday Magazine, citing the need for the sidewalk space for outdoor patios. CHEK News covered the issue with one citizen saying (at 7:18), "We don't use the Monday Magazine anymore, and there's a lot of trashy boxes."

See also
List of magazines in Canada

References

External links
Monday Magazine Home Page
Association of Alternative Newsweeklies

1975 establishments in British Columbia
Alternative magazines
Black Press
Visual arts magazines published in Canada
Weekly magazines published in Canada
Entertainment magazines
Listings magazines
Local interest magazines published in Canada
Magazines established in 1975
Magazines published in British Columbia
Mass media in Victoria, British Columbia